Sleep temples (also known as dream temples or Egyptian sleep temples) are regarded by some as an early instance of hypnosis over 4000 years ago, under the influence of Imhotep. Imhotep served as Chancellor and as High Priest of the sun god Ra at Heliopolis. He was said to be a son of the ancient Egyptian demiurge Ptah, his mother being a mortal named Khredu-ankh.

Sleep temples were hospitals of sorts, healing a variety of ailments, perhaps many of them psychological in nature. Patients were taken to an unlit chamber to sleep and be treated for their specific ailment.The treatment involved chanting, placing the patient into a trance-like or hypnotic state, and analysing their dreams in order to determine treatment. Meditation, fasting, baths, and sacrifices to the patron deity or other spirits were often involved as well. 

Sleep temples also existed in the Middle East and Ancient Greece. In Greece, they were built in honor of Asclepios, the Greek god of medicine and were called Asclepieions. The Greek treatment was referred to as incubation and focused on prayers to Asclepios for healing. These sleep chambers were filled with snakes, a symbol to Asclepios.  A similar Hebrew treatment was referred to as Kavanah and involved focusing on letters of the Hebrew alphabet spelling the name of their God. In 1928, Mortimer Wheeler unearthed a Roman sleep temple at Lydney Park, Gloucestershire, with the assistance of a young J.R.R. Tolkien.

References 

 1

External links
Mindtech Associates - The Roots of Hypnosis
Jeffrey Mishlove, PhD - An Egyptian Journey of the Soul 1995
Infinity Institute - Hypnosis, Yesterday, Today and Tomorrow
University Of Metaphysical Sciences - Dreams & Dreaming
College of Hypnotherapy  - Hypnosis in History

History of ancient medicine
Greek mythology